Elections to the Assam Legislative Assembly were held in 1991 to elect members of 126 constituencies in Assam, India. The Indian National Congress won the popular vote and a majority of seats and Hiteswar Saikia was appointed as the Chief Minister of Assam for his second term. The number of constituencies was set as 126, by the recommendation of the Delimitation Commission of India.

Result

Elected members

See also
List of constituencies of the Assam Legislative Assembly
1991 elections in India

References

Assam
State Assembly elections in Assam
1990s in Assam